Magna Graecia was the name given by the Romans to the coastal areas of Southern Italy in the present-day Italian regions of Calabria, Apulia, Basilicata, Campania and Sicily; these regions were extensively populated by Greek settlers. These settlers, who began arriving in the 8th century BC, brought with them their Hellenic civilization, which left a lasting imprint on Italy (such as in the culture of ancient Rome). They also influenced the native peoples, such as the Sicels and the Oenotrians, who became hellenized after they adopted the Greek culture as their own.

Strabo also used the term to refer to the size of the territory that had been conquered by the Greeks, and the Roman poet Ovid used the term in his poem Fasti.

Antiquity

According to Strabo's Geographica, the colonization of Magna Graecia had already begun by the time of the Trojan War and lasted for several centuries.

In the 8th and 7th century BC, due to demographic crises (famine, overcrowding, etc.), stasis, a developing need for new commercial outlets and ports, and expulsion from their homeland after wars, Greeks began to settle in southern Italy. Colonies began to be established all over the Mediterranean and Black Seas (with the exception of Northwestern Africa, in the sphere of influence of Carthage), including in Sicily and the southern part of the Italian Peninsula. The Romans called this area Magna Graecia (Latin for "Greater Greece") since it was so densely inhabited by the Greeks. Ancient geographers differed on whether the term included Sicily or merely Apulia, Campania and Calabria, Strabo and Livy being the most prominent advocates of the wider definitions.

With colonization, Greek culture was exported to Italy in its dialects of the Ancient Greek language, its religious rites and its traditions of the independent polis. An original Hellenic civilization soon developed and later interacted with the native Italic civilisations. The most important cultural transplant was the Chalcidean/Cumaean variety of the Greek alphabet, which was adopted by the Etruscans; the Old Italic alphabet subsequently evolved into the Latin alphabet, which became the most widely used alphabet in the world.

Some of these Hellenic colonies still stand today such as Neapolis ("New City", now Naples), Syracuse, Akragas (Agrigento), Taras (Taranto), Rhegion (Reggio Calabria), or Kroton (Crotone).

The first Greek city to be absorbed into the Roman Republic was Neapolis in 327 BC. The other Greek cities in Italy followed during the Samnite Wars and the Pyrrhic War; Taras was the last to fall in 272. Sicily was conquered by Rome during the First Punic War. Only Syracuse remained independent until 212 because its king Hiero II was a devoted ally of the Romans. His grandson Hieronymus however made an alliance with Hannibal, which prompted the Romans to besiege the city, which fell in 212 despite the machines of Archimedes, described by Proclus in his commentary on Euclid's Elements. Archimedes constructed weapons powered by compressed air, weights and counterweights, according to Ctesibius and Hero.

List of Hellenic Poleis in Italy 
This is a list of the 22 poleis (city states) in Italy, according to Mogens Herman Hansen. It does not list all the Hellenic settlements, only those organised around a polis structure.

List of Hellenic Poleis in Sicily 
This is a list of the 46 poleis (city states) in Sicily, according to Mogens Herman Hansen. It does not list all the Hellenic settlements, only those organised around a polis structure.

Middle Ages

During the Early Middle Ages, following the disastrous Gothic War, new waves of Byzantine Christian Greeks fleeing the Slavic invasion of Peloponnese settled in Calabria, further strengthened the Hellenic element in the region. The iconoclast emperor Leo III appropriated lands that had been granted to the Papacy in southern Italy and the Eastern Roman (Byzantine) Empire continued to govern the area in the form of the Catapanate of Italy (965 -1071) through the Middle Ages, well after northern Italy fell to the Lombards.

At the time of the Normans' late medieval conquest of southern Italy and Sicily (in the late 12th century), the Salento peninsula (the "heel" of Italy), up to one-third of Sicily (concentrated in the Val Demone), and much of Calabria and Lucania were still largely Greek-speaking. Some regions of southern Italy experienced demographic shifts as Greeks began to migrate northwards in significant numbers from regions further south; one such region was Cilento, which came to have a Greek-speaking majority. At this time the language had evolved into medieval Greek, also known as Byzantine Greek, and its speakers were known as Byzantine Greeks. The resultant fusion of local Byzantine Greek culture with Norman and Arab culture (from the Arab occupation of Sicily) gave rise to Norman-Arab-Byzantine culture on Sicily.

A remnant of this influence can be found in the survival of the Greek language in some villages of the above mentioned Salento peninsula (the "heel" of Italy). This living dialect of Greek, known locally as Griko, is found in the Italian regions of Calabria and Apulia. Griko is considered by linguists to be a descendant of Byzantine Greek, which had been the majority language of Salento through the Middle Ages, combining also some ancient Doric and local romance elements. There is a rich oral tradition and Griko folklore, limited now but once numerous, to around 30,000 people, most of them having abandoned their language in favour of Italian. Some scholars, such as Gerhard Rohlfs, argue that the origins of Griko may ultimately be traced to the colonies of Magna Graecia.

Modern Italy
Although many of the Greek inhabitants of Southern Italy were entirely Latinized during the Middle Ages, pockets of Greek culture and language remained and survived into modernity partly because of continuous immigration to southern Italy from the Greek mainland. One example is the Griko people in Calabria and Salento, some of whom still maintain their Greek language and customs. Their working practices have been passed down through generations through storytelling and allowing the observation of work. The Italian parliament recognizes the Griko people as an ethnolinguistic minority under the official name of Minoranze linguistiche Grike dell'Etnia Griko-Calabrese e Salentina.

Greek nobles started taking refuge in Italy following the Fall of Constantinople in 1453. Greeks immigrated once again to the region in the 16th and 17th centuries in reaction to the conquest of the Peloponnese by the Ottoman Empire. Especially after the end of the Siege of Coron (1534), large numbers of Greeks took refuge in the areas of Calabria, Salento and Sicily. Greeks from Coroni, the so-called Coronians, were nobles, who brought with them substantial movable property. 

Other Greeks who moved to Italy came from the Mani Peninsula of the Peloponnese. The Maniots (their name originating from the Greek word mania) were known for their proud military traditions and for their bloody vendettas, many of which still continue today. Another group of Maniot Greeks moved to Corsica in the 17th century under the protection of the Republic of Genoa.

See also

References

Sources
 Polyxeni Adam-Veleni and Dimitra Tsangari (editors), Greek colonisation: New data, current approaches; Proceedings of the scientific meeting held in Thessaloniki (6 February 2015), Athens, Alpha Bank, 2015.
Michael J. Bennett, Aaron J. Paul, Mario Iozzo, & Bruce M. White, Magna Graecia: Greek Art From South Italy and Sicily, Cleveland, OH, Cleveland Museum of Art, 2002.
John Boardman, N. G. L. Hammond (editors), The Cambridge Ancient History, vol. III, part 3, The Expansion of the Greek World, Eighth to Sixth Centuries B.C., Cambridge University Press, 1982.
Giovanni Casadio & Patricia A. Johnston, Mystic Cults In Magna Graecia, Austin, University of Texas Press, 2009.
Lucia Cerchiai, Lorenna Jannelli, & Fausto Longo (editors), The Greek cities of Magna Graecia and Sicily, Photography by Mark E. Smith, Los Angeles, J. Paul Getty Museum, 2004.
Giovanna Ceserani, Italy's Lost Greece: Magna Graecia and the Making of Modern Archaeology, New York, Oxford University Press, 2012.
T. J. Dunbabin, The Western Greeks, 1948.
M. Gualtieri, Fourth Century B.C. Magna Graecia: A Case Study, Jonsered, Sweden, P. Åströms, 1993.
Mogens Herman Hansen & Thomas Heine Nielsen, An Inventory of Archaic and Classical Poleis, Oxford University Press, 2004.
R. Ross Holloway, Art and Coinage In Magna Graecia, Bellinzona, Edizioni arte e moneta, 1978.
Margaret Ellen Mayo, The Art of South Italy: Vases From Magna Graecia, Richmond, Virginia Museum of Fine Arts, 1982.
Giovanni Pugliese Carratelli, The Greek World: Art and Civilization In Magna Graecia and Sicily, New York: Rizzoli, 1996.
———— (editor), The Western Greeks: Catalog of an exhibition held in the Palazzo Grassi, Venice, March–Dec., 1996, Milan, Bompiani, 1976.
William Smith, "Magna Graecia." In Dictionary of Greek and Roman Geography, 1854.
A. G. Woodhead, The Greeks in the West, 1962.
Günther Zuntz, Persephone: Three Essays On Religion and Thought In Magna Graecia, Oxford, Clarendon Press, 1971.

External links

 Map. Ancient Coins.
 David Willey. Italy rediscovers Greek heritage. BBC News. 21 June 2005, 17:19 GMT 18:19 UK.
 Gaze On The Sea. Salentine Peninsula, Greece and Greater Greece. (in Italian, Greek and English)
 Oriamu pisulina. Traditional Griko song performed by Ghetonia.
 Kalinifta. Traditional Griko song performed by amateur local group.
 Second Interdisciplinary Symposium on the Hellenic Heritage of Southern Italy. Archaeological Institute of America (AIA). June 11, 2015. (Dates: Monday, May 30, 2016 to Thursday, June 2, 2016.)
 Sergio Tofanelli et al. The Greeks in the West: genetic signatures of the Hellenic colonisation in southern Italy and Sicily. European Journal of Human Genetics, (15 July 2015).

 
Ancient Italian history
Historical regions